The 1979 National Invitation Tournament was the 1979 edition of the annual NCAA college basketball competition.  Indiana University defeated their rival Purdue University 53–52 in the championship game.  Purdue appeared in the 1980 NCAA Men's Final Four while Indiana won the national championship at the 1981 NCAA Men's Final Four.

Selected teams
Below is a list of the 24 teams selected for the tournament.

 Alabama
 Alcorn State
 Central Michigan
 Clemson
 Dayton
 Holy Cross
 Indiana
 Kentucky
 Maryland
 Mississippi State
 Nevada
 New Mexico
 Northeast Louisiana
 Ohio State
 Old Dominion
 Oregon State
 Purdue
 Rhode Island
 Saint Joseph's
 St. Bonaventure
 Texas A&M
 Texas Tech
 Virginia
 Wagner

Brackets
Below are the three first round brackets, along with the four-team championship bracket.

 Indiana and Ohio State received byes to the Semifinals.

Semifinals & finals

See also
 1979 NCAA Division I basketball tournament
 1979 NCAA Division II basketball tournament
 1979 NCAA Division III basketball tournament
 1979 NAIA Division I men's basketball tournament
 1979 National Women's Invitational Tournament

References

National Invitation
National Invitation Tournament
1970s in Manhattan
Basketball in New York City
College sports in New York City
Madison Square Garden
National Invitation Tournament
National Invitation Tournament
Sports competitions in New York City
Sports in Manhattan